Epicorsia lucialis is a moth in the family Crambidae. It is found in Ecuador and on St. Lucia.

Subspecies
Epicorsia lucialis lucialis (St. Lucia)
Epicorsia lucialis baezalis Munroe, 1958 (Ecuador)

References

Moths described in 1958
Pyraustinae